Bambang Kesowo is a retired bureaucrat and politician. He is known for being a few of Indonesian state bureaucrats to have risen from a lowest rank (Analyst) to the Minister of a ministry in continuous way and not a political party member to reaching his way to Ministership.

Early life and education 
Bambang was graduated from Faculty of Law, Gadjah Mada University in 1968. During his time as Gadjah Mada student, he was active in Indonesian National Student Movement (Indonesian: Gerakan Mahasiswa Nasional Indonesia) a nationalist-marhaenist student organization. He later took Master of Law specializing in Laws in Intellectual Property Rights from Harvard Law School (graduated in 1983).

Careers 
After graduated from Gadjah Mada, he become an Analyst at Bureau of Analyst and Formulation of Law at State Secretariat in 1968. He later risen to the rank of Deputy Assistant of Law, Assistant to the State Secretariat in Governmental Affairs (1973), Deputy Assistant of General Affairs, Assistant to the State Secretariat in Governmental Affairs (1976), Deputy Assistant of General Affairs, Assistant to the State Secretariat in Governmental Affairs and Non-Department Agencies (1979), Head of State Secretariat, Bureau of Legal Affairs and Formulation of Law (1983 - 1994), Vice Cabinet Secretary (1994 - 1999), Secretary of Vice President (1999 - 2001), and finally Minister of State Secretary (2001 - 2004).

His mastery in intellectual property rights made him as high-level negotiators and representative from Indonesia government with various International Organizations such as WIPO and United Nations, during his time in State Secretariat.

Political Relation 
He supported Megawati Soekarnoputri, despite hailed from high rank officials of Suharto Administration and Suharto Administration stance against her. He is pro democracy. He also left legacy to democracy in Indonesia by drafting Government in Lieu of Law No. 2/1998 which ensure Freedom of Speech in Public.

Post-Ministerial Careers 
After no longer become minister, he retired. His expert opinion was crucial for advising People's Representative Council in making of Omnibus Law on Job Creation.

He supported National Research and Innovation Agency (BRIN) formation. On 13 October 2021, he appointed as Member of BRIN Steering Committee by Joko Widodo, recalled him from his long retirement to government work.

References 

Living people
1945 births
Indonesian politicians
Gadjah Mada University alumni
Harvard Law School alumni